The Violin Player is the first techno/pop album by classical and pop musician Vanessa-Mae, released in 1995. It is the first album Vanessa-Mae released on the EMI label. The album was produced by Mike Batt, and engineered by Gareth Cousins, who also programmed the synthesisers and beats for the album.

Content
The Violin Player features a varied blend of music – covers of classical music (J.S. Bach's Toccata and Fugue in D minor), remakes of old favourites (including American composer Mason Williams' "Classical Gas"), original compositions (seven tracks composed by British musician and songwriter Mike Batt), and one original track by Vanessa-Mae herself, co-written with Ian Wherry ("Red Hot").

Singles
Three singles were released from the album: "Toccata and Fugue", which reached number 16 in the UK Singles Chart, "Red Hot", which reached number 37 and "Classical Gas", which reached number 41.

Commercial performance
The Violin Player reached number 11 in the UK Albums Chart in February 1995, and was certified Gold by the BPI in June 1995. It has sold over 1.2 million copies worldwide. The album has been reissued as a multi-channel hybrid SACD by EMI Music Hong Kong.

Track listing

Personnel
Credits adapted from the album's liner notes.

Musicians
Vanessa-Mae – violin
Mike Batt – keyboards (tracks 1–9)
Gareth Cousins – synthesisers (tracks 1–9)
Martin Bliss – guitars (track 10)
Clem Clempson – guitars (tracks 1–9)
Dick Morgan – oboe (track 1)
Maurice Murphy – trumpet (track 1)
Royal Philharmonic Orchestra – orchestra; conducted by Mike Batt
Phil Todd – saxophones
Vasko Vassilev – violin/viola section (track 10)
Ian Wherry – keyboards (track 10)

Production
Tracks 1–9 produced and arranged by Mike Batt
Tracks 1–9 programmed and arranged by Gareth Cousins
Track 10 produced and arranged by Ian Wherry and Vanessa-Mae
Track 10 programmed by Ian Wherry; mix engineer: Ben Robbins
Mastered by Ray Staff
Music typesetting: John Zaradin
Photography: John Paul
Sleeve by Stuart @ Peacock Marketing Design
Recorded and engineered by Gareth Cousins at Abbey Road Studios and Whitfield Street Recording Studios, London

Charts

Weekly charts

Year-end charts

Certifications

References

   

Vanessa-Mae albums
1995 albums
EMI Records albums
Albums produced by Mike Batt